Jowzan (also Romanized as Jowzān and Jaūzān; also known as Zaūzan) is a village in Jowzan Rural District, in the Central District of Malayer County, Hamadan Province, Iran. At the 2006 census, its population was 2,854, in 740 families.

References 

Populated places in Malayer County